Club Deportivo Filanbanco was a football team based out of Guayaquil, Ecuador. It was formed in 1979 by Filanbanco, one of the largest banks in Ecuador. The club dissolved a little after one decade of existence when it ceded its team to Valdez Sporting Club. Valdez proceeded to dissolve a few years later It was the Serie A runner-up in 1987.

The club was refunded in February 3 of 2020 after a 29 year absence in Ecuadorian football, a man named Danny Pazos who was in the juvenile team for this club refunded it along with other people who had ties with this team, CD Filanbanco entered the Segunda Categoria aka Ecuador´s 3rd division.

Achievements
Campeonato Ecuatoriano de Fútbol Serie A
Runner-up (1): 1987

Notable players
 Perico Mina
 Alex Cevallos

References

Filanbanco, Club Deportivo
1979 establishments in Ecuador
Football clubs in Ecuador